Whelston, part of the Bagillt West electoral ward of Flintshire County Council, Wales, is just off the A548 coast road, and has been signposted as Boot End since 2002. Boot End is a colloquial name for the areas of Whelston, Walwen, Riverbank, and New Brighton in Bagillt.

Villages in Flintshire